JAQ may refer to:
 JAQ (b-boy) (born 1979), American breakdancer, writer and MC
 Amador County Airport, in California, United States
 Jacquinot Bay Airport, in Papua New Guinea
 Yaqay language of Indonesia